Volga (Povolzhsky) economic region (tr.: Povolzhsky ekonomichesky rayon) is one of 12 economic regions of Russia.

Composition
Astrakhan Oblast (part of Southern Federal District)
Republic of Kalmykia (part of Southern Federal District)
Penza Oblast (part of Volga Federal District)
Samara Oblast (part of Volga Federal District)
Saratov Oblast (part of Volga Federal District)
Republic of Tatarstan (part of Volga Federal District)
Ulyanovsk Oblast (part of Volga Federal District)
Volgograd Oblast (part of Southern Federal District)

Socio-economic indicators
Volga economic region accounted for almost 8 per cent of the national GRP in 2008. Popular approval of economic change is well above average in this region, both in terms of the rating of the national economy and the expectation of improvements in their own lives and in the household economy. People are also more likely than the average to have consumer goods. Life expectancy for men and women is also just above the national average.

However, reported GDP per capita is below the national average, and the regional wage levels are one-sixth below the national average. However, the likelihood of not being paid regularly is also below the national average. The discrepancies between these data and positive optimism of individuals can be influenced by the fact that in the Volga economic region those reporting having a second job are also above the national average.

References

Economic regions of Russia